Lissenden may refer to :
 Eric Lissenden, Australian rules footballer
 Lissenden Gardens, area in north London, England